Arald may refer to:

Arald, version of the name Harold
Arald (opera)
Arald, pen name of Barbu Lăzăreanu
Arald, Archdeacon of Wells
Arald, Danish warrior in Gwendoline (opera) by Emmanuel Chabrier and Catulle Mendès